Lina Krhlikar (born 29 June 1989) is a Slovenian handball player for Frisch Auf Göppingen and the Slovenian national team.

She participated at the 2016 European Women's Handball Championship.

References

1989 births
Living people
Slovenian female handball players
Handball players from Ljubljana
Expatriate handball players
Slovenian expatriate sportspeople in France
Slovenian expatriate sportspeople in Germany
Frisch Auf Göppingen players
Slovenian expatriate sportspeople in Spain